The Harrisburg Odd Fellows Hall, also known as I.O.O.F. Covenant Lodge No. 12, in the small community of Harrisburg, Oregon, USA, was built in 1882. Odd Fellows chapter members L. Stites, a local brickmason and brickyard owner, and John Martin, a carpenter, significantly helped in its construction. The Harrisburg Disseminator then declared it to be "'the finest building in this part of the Willamette Valley'".

It was listed on the National Register of Historic Places in 1992 for its Italianate architecture. It was historically as a meeting hall, a theater and a specialty store.

It is a prominent historic building in Harrisbury's old commercial center, and, in 1992, it had a completely intact lodge hall in the front  of its second floor. It is a two-story  by  brick building that is mostly intact, with the exception of its missing cornice. The lodge hall includes plaster walls, coved cornice, door and window trim, tongue-and-grove wainscot and "bases and crested arched backing daises at opposite ends of the hall".

References

1882 establishments in Oregon
Buildings and structures in Linn County, Oregon
Italianate architecture in Oregon
National Register of Historic Places in Linn County, Oregon
Odd Fellows buildings in Oregon